Wilton is a city in Beltrami County, Minnesota, United States. The population was 204 at the 2010 census.   Wilton is considered a bedroom community of Bemidji.

Geography

Demographics

2010 census
As of the census of 2010, there were 204 people, 78 households, and 55 families living in the city. The racial makeup of the city was 91.7% White, 1.5% Native American, 1.5% Asian, and 5.4% from two or more races. Hispanic or Latino of any race were 1.0% of the population.

There were 78 households, of which 38.5% had children under the age of 18 living with them, 51.3% were married couples living together, 14.1% had a female householder with no husband present, 5.1% had a male householder with no wife present, and 29.5% were non-families. 20.5% of all households were made up of individuals, and 7.7% had someone living alone who was 65 years of age or older. The average household size was 2.62 and the average family size was 3.02.

The median age in the city was 35.7 years. 24% of residents were under the age of 18; 9.8% were between the ages of 18 and 24; 21.5% were from 25 to 44; 33.3% were from 45 to 64; and 11.3% were 65 years of age or older. The gender makeup of the city was 55.9% male and 44.1% female.

2000 census
As of the census of 2000, there were 186 people, 73 households, and 54 families living in the city. The racial makeup of the city was 97.31% White, 1.08% Native American, and 1.61% from two or more races. Hispanic or Latino of any race were 1.61% of the population.

There were 73 households, out of which 37.0% had children under the age of 18 living with them, 53.4% were married couples living together, 12.3% had a female householder with no husband present, and 26.0% were non-families. 20.5% of all households were made up of individuals, and 8.2% had someone living alone who was 65 years of age or older.  The average household size was 2.55 and the average family size was 2.91.

In the city, the population was spread out, with 28.5% under the age of 18, 8.1% from 18 to 24, 29.6% from 25 to 44, 22.6% from 45 to 64, and 11.3% who were 65 years of age or older.  The median age was 36 years. For every 100 females, there were 111.4 males.  For every 100 females age 18 and over, there were 95.6 males.

The median income for a household in the city was $33,750, and the median income for a family was $37,083. Males had a median income of $17,500 versus $20,750 for females. The per capita income for the city was $13,432.  About 8.0% of families and 14.7% of the population were below the poverty line, including 26.5% of those under the age of eighteen and none of those 65 or over.

References

Cities in Beltrami County, Minnesota
Cities in Minnesota